Sonadora is a barrio in the municipality of Aguas Buenas, Puerto Rico. Its population in 2010 was 3,191. In Sonadora barrio is part of the Aguas Buenas urban zone.

History
Puerto Rico was ceded by Spain in the aftermath of the Spanish–American War under the terms of the Treaty of Paris of 1898 and became an unincorporated territory of the United States. In 1899, the United States Department of War conducted a census of Puerto Rico finding that the combined population of Sonadora and Mula barrio was 1,183.

Special Communities

In 2001, law 1-2001 was passed to identify marginalized communities of Puerto Rico. In 2017, Governor Rosello created a new government agency to work with the Special Communities of Puerto Rico Program.

See also

 List of communities in Puerto Rico

References

Barrios of Aguas Buenas, Puerto Rico